The Real North Korea: Life and Politics in the Failed Stalinist Utopia is a 2013 non-fiction book by Andrei Lankov, about North Korea, published by Oxford University Press.

Content
The work has a total of six chapters.

Reception
Max Fisher of The Washington Post argued the book is best for people who have existing background knowledge of North Korea, and described it as "an excellent primer on the experts’ understanding of North Korea and a fascinating series of insights". Fisher criticised the book for having unnecessary words at times and a "less than electrifying" writing style.

Donghyun Woo wrote that the work is "one of the most informative and useful guidelines" for academic and non-academic viewers, although he criticised "simplistic characterizations and teleological narratives that will likely reinforce unproductive received perceptions".

Publishers Weekly gave the book a starred review, as one of "PW's Picks", and described it as "one of the best and most accessible recent accounts" of North Korea.

Kirkus Reviews describes the book as "A well-reasoned survey".

References

External links
 The Real North Korea - Hosted on the Internet Archive, registration required
 Profile and Profile 2 at Google Books

2013 non-fiction books
Books about North Korea
Oxford University Press books